Spare the rod may refer to:

 Proverbs 13:24, commonly mistaken as the origin of the exact phrase 'spare the rod and spoil the child': "He that spareth his rod hateth his son: but he that loveth him chasteneth him betimes."
 A line from the 17th century Samuel Butler poem Hudibras, whose wording is commonly mistaken to be that of the Bible verse: "Spare the rod and spoil the child"
 Spare the Rod (1954 film), a short Disney animated film
 Spare the Rod (1961 film), a British social drama directed by Leslie Norman and starring Max Bygraves